Jerrold D. Green is the president and chief executive officer of the Pacific Council on International Policy in Los Angeles, California. He is concurrently a research professor at the University of Southern California Annenberg School for Communication and Journalism.

Previously, he has served as partner and executive vice president for International Operations at Best Associates in Dallas, Texas. He also occupied a number of senior management positions at the RAND Corporation in Santa Monica, California, where he was awarded the RAND Medal for Excellence. Among these positions, he served as corporate research manager, director of international programs and development, and director of the Center for Middle East Public Policy. He has also served as a professor of political science at the University of Michigan and the University of Arizona.

His work on Middle East policy and politics has appeared in such publications as Comparative Politics, The Harvard Journal of World Affairs, The Huffington Post, the Iranian Journal of International Affairs, Politique Étrangère, the RAND Review, Survival, World Politics, and many others.

Early life

Born in Boston, Massachusetts, he graduated with a B.A. with Distinction in politics (summa cum laude) from University of Massachusetts at Boston. He has both a M.A. and Ph.D. in political science from the University of Chicago, where he specialized in Middle East politics. Green conducted research in Iran during the period of the Iranian Revolution as a fellow at the Tehran-based Iran Communications and Development Institute.

Green was awarded a Fulbright Fellowship to Cairo University in 1982. Green started his academic career as a professor in the Department of Political Science and Center for Near Eastern and North African Studies at the University of Michigan. He then became a professor of political science and sociology at the University of Arizona, where he served as director for The Center for Middle Eastern Studies. He is a member of the Council on Foreign Relations, has served on numerous study groups focusing on international policy, as well as track II initiatives with Iran and Libya. He has spoken at conferences and other gatherings around the world.

Career
In 1996, Green became the director at the Center for Middle East Public Policy at the RAND Corporation, and then director of international programs and development at RAND. During that time, Green authored numerous pieces on issues including NATO policy in the Mediterranean, US-Middle East relations, the security policies of Iran,  and democracy and Islam in Afghanistan.

Green also served as partner and executive vice president for international operations at Best Associates, a privately held merchant banking firm with global operations, and executive vice president for academic affairs for the Whitney International University System and the senior advisory board of Academic Partnerships, both based in Dallas, Texas. Green later returned to RAND, where he oversaw an attempt to broaden RAND's Middle East-based policy analysis work.

Green has lectured on six continents and has been a visiting fellow at the Chinese Academy of Social Science's West Asian Studies Center in Beijing, China; a visiting lecturer at the Havana based Center for African and Middle East Studies, a fellow at the Australian Defence College, and delivered papers at conferences sponsored by the Iranian Institute of International Affairs in Tehran, Iran.

Green has lived abroad as a Fulbright Fellow in Egypt, three years in Israel, and conducted field research in Iran. He has visited virtually every other Middle Eastern country.

Since 2008, Green has served as the president and chief executive officer of the Pacific Council on International Policy in Los Angeles.

Advisory roles
Green is a member of the Council on Foreign Relations, the International Institute for Strategic Studies, the California Club, the Lincoln Club, U.S. Department of State Advisory Committee on International Economic Policy, the Los Angeles Coalition for the Economy and Jobs Tourism Committee, and the USC Center on Public Diplomacy Advisory Board. Green also serves as an International Medical Corps ambassador. He is currently a reserve deputy sheriff with the Los Angeles Sheriff's Department after serving as a specialist reserve officer with the Los Angeles Police Department, where he advised on issues related to terrorism and intelligence. He received a Meritorious Service Award for his work. Green is also currently a technical advisor to Activision Publishing where he consults on the highly successful Call of Duty video game series.

Green previously served on the board of directors of the California Club, the advisory committee of The Asia Society of Southern California, the advisory board of Whitney International University, the advisory board of Academic Partnerships, the board of managers of Falcon Waterfree Technologies, and the board of the Middle East Institute at Columbia University. Green served as a member of the U.S. Secretary of the Navy Advisory Panel for eight years, and was awarded the Distinguished Civilian Service Award.

Other previous roles

President and CEO of the Pacific Council
In 2008, Green became the president and chief executive officer of the Pacific Council on International Policy, located in Los Angeles, California. The Pacific Council is "committed to building the vast potential of the West Coast for impact on global issues, discourse, and policy" through its events, conferences, delegations and task forces. The Pacific Council focuses on four specific initiatives: Global Water Scarcity Project, Global Los Angeles, Mexico Initiative, and the Guantánamo Bay Observer Program. The Pacific Council has hosted events with featured speakers such as former Secretaries of State Hillary Clinton, John Kerry, Condoleezza Rice, former President George W. Bush, Los Angeles Mayor Eric Garcetti, former CIA Director Leon Panetta, General James Mattis, foreign dignitaries, U.S. ambassadors, members of Congress, and foreign policy experts, among others. Green has led three U.S. Department of Defense-sponsored delegations to Afghanistan and another to Iraq. He has also led Pacific Council fact-finding delegations to Argentina, Chile, China, Cuba, France,  Myanmar, North Korea, Russia, Uzbekistan, and South Sudan. In addition, Green served as a member of a joint task force between the Pacific Council and the Consejo Mexicano de Asuntos Internationales (COMEXI)  that looked at the U.S.–Mexican border. He has also represented the Pacific Council as an observer at the legal proceedings being conducted at Guantánamo Bay, Cuba, by the U.S. Department of Defense. Recommendations made by the Council's Guantánamo Bay task force were included in the FY2018 Defense Bill by Congressman Adam Schiff (D-CA). In March 2019, Green received the 2019 World Trade Week Southern California Stanley T. Olafson Bronze Plaque Award on behalf of the L.A. Area Chamber of Commerce. The award is presented to a member of the community whose dedication and achievements have advanced trade in the Southern California region.

Publications
 Revolution in Iran: The Politics of Countermobilization. Praeger, 1982.
 "Friends of the Devil: U.S.-Iran Ties Beyond a Nuclear Deal", Huffington Post World, 21 October 2014.
 "Obama, Take Note: Wireless Revolution is Coming to Myanmar", Huffington Post World, 24 May 2013.
 "The Ghosts of Abu Ghraib Exorcised?" with William Loomis; Huffington Post,  15 July 2010.
 "La politique américaine et le conflit iraélo-palestinien", Politique Étrangère,  July–September 2002.
 "No Escape", The World Today, Royal Institute of International Affairs, Chatham House, London, 2002.
 "A Memo to the President: Structural Problems in the Middle East", Middle East Insight, November 2000.
 "The Information Revolution and Political Opposition in the Middle East", Middle East Studies Association Bulletin, 1999.
 "An Atlantic Partnership in the Middle East", with David Gompert and F. Steven Larrabee; RAND Review, Spring 1999.
 "Where Are The Arabs?" Survival, 1998.
 "Gulf Security With the Gulf States?" Harvard Journal of World Affairs: The Journal for International Policy, 1995.
 "Israel's Right is Wrong", Al Ahram Weekly (Cairo), 9 November 1995.
 "Conflict, Consensus, and Gulf Security", The Iranian Journal of International Affairs, Winter 1993.
 "Ideology and Pragmatism in Iranian Foreign Policy", Journal of South Asian and Middle Eastern Studies, Fall 1993.
 "Iran's Foreign Policy: Between Enmity and Conciliation", Current History January 1993.
 "Parallel Cities", The New York Times Book Review, 17 November 1991.
 "U.S. AID's Democratic Pluralism Initiative: Pragmatism or Alturism?" Ethics and International Affairs 1991.
 "The Rationality of Collective Political Action: Germany, Israel, and Peru," – Senior Investigator, Funded by the National Science Foundation – 1987–1991.
 "Are Arab Politics Still Arab?" World Politics, July 1986.
 "Terrorism in the Middle East", U.S.A. Today, 11 November 1985.
 "Countermobilization as a Revolutionary Form", Comparative Politics, January 1984.
 "Qadhafi's Not Always to Blame", Wall Street Journal, 11 May 1984.
 Social Science Research Council/Joint Committee on the Middle East of the American Council of Learned Societies Research Grant (Supported by the National Endowment for the Humanities and the Ford Foundation) – 1983–1984

Awards and honors

References

External links

1948 births
Living people
RAND Corporation people
University of Southern California faculty
Arabic-speaking people
University of Massachusetts Boston alumni
University of Chicago alumni
University of Michigan faculty
People from Boston
University of Arizona faculty